Kimon Emmanuilovich Argyropoulo (— 27 October 1918) was a Russian ambassador to Persia, serving from 1897–1902. He was instrumental in helping to negotiate a Russian loan to Mozzaffar ed-Din Shah, the Shah of Persia, in 1900. He also later served as the Senior Counselor of the Ministry of Foreign Affairs under Count Lamsdorff.

1842 births
1918 deaths
Diplomats of the Russian Empire
Ambassadors of the Russian Empire to Iran
Russian people of Greek descent